The Battle of Purutué Bank (also called Redemption Island, Itapirú Bank, Carayá Island, Carvalho Island, Cabrita Island or Vitória Island) took place on 10 April 1866, during the Paraguayan War.

Preparation
The Imperial Brazilian Army decided to occupy the island, important for its position in relation to the fort and the enemy camp, to serve as a point of support against the Paraguayans. On 5 April 1866, lieutenant colonel of engineers José Carlos de Carvalho was ordered to ship a 12-inch La Hitte battery and a 4-inch mortar, in addition to the corresponding material to cover them. The garrison of the island, composed of the aforementioned batteries, 100 soldiers of the Battalion of Engineers, the 7th infantry battalion of Fatherland Volunteers and the 14th Battalion of the National Guard, was commanded by lieutenant colonel João Carlos de Villagran Cabrita.

The Battle
At 4 am on 10 April 1866, a Paraguayan force landed on the island trying to dislodge the Brazilian troops from their position. They were repelled with great losses and withdrew under the fire of the Brazilian fleet, which, in turn, was forced to withdraw before the fire of the Itapirú fort.

Colonel Villagran Cabrita was killed by a bomb fired from the Itapirú fort when, aboard a boat that contained ammunition for the island's garrison, he dictated the victory report. His name was given to the island.

References 

April 1866 events
Battles involving Paraguay
Battles involving Brazil
Conflicts in 1866
Naval battles of the Paraguayan War